The 2022 Tour of Romania was a six-day cycling stage race that took place in Romania in September 2022. The race was the 55th edition of the Tour of Romania. The tour was rated as a 2.1 event, as part of the 2022 UCI Europe Tour.

Mark Stewart became the first British rider to win the Tour of Romania.

Route

Teams
25 teams were at the start of the race. These included two UCI Pro teams, 21 Continental teams and two national teams.

Stages

Prologue 
6 September 2022 — Satu Mare,  (ITT)

Stage 1 
7 September 2022 — Satu Mare to Bistrița,

Stage 2 
8 September 2022 — Bistrița to Târgu Mureș,

Stage 3 
9 September 2022 — Târgu Mureș to Făgăraș,

Stage 4 
10 September 2022 — Cristian to Curtea de Argeș,

Stage 5 
11 September 2022 — Bucharest,

Classification leadership table

Standings

General classification

Points classification

Mountains classification

Young rider classification

Best Romanian rider classification

Team classification

See also

 2022 in men's road cycling
 2022 in sports

References

External links

2022 UCI Europe Tour
2022 in Romanian sport
2022
Tour of Romania